Kansas's 5th congressional district is an obsolete district for representation in the United States House of Representatives.

It existed from 1885 to 1993.

Geography 
The former district contained some of the southern suburbs of Wichita, as well as the towns of Pittsburg. Most of the district was rural.

List of members representing the district

References

 Congressional Biographical Directory of the United States 1774–present

Former congressional districts of the United States
05